College Township is a township in Linn County, Iowa, United States.

History
College Township was organized in 1858.

References

Townships in Linn County, Iowa
Townships in Iowa
1858 establishments in Iowa
Populated places established in 1858